Charles Lorenzo Chatham (December 25, 1901 – December 15, 1975) was a United States Major League Baseball infielder. He played two seasons with the Boston Braves from 1930 to 1931.

After his Major League career finished, Chatham played for many years in the Texas League, hitting over .300 in seven seasons and playing shortstop for the championship winning Fort Worth team in 1939 and 1940. Chatham later worked as a scout for the Pittsburgh Pirates, San Francisco Giants, Detroit Tigers and Texas Rangers.

References

External links

1901 births
1975 deaths
Atlanta Crackers players
Baseball players from Texas
Bonham Bingers players
Boston Braves players
Dallas Steers players
Detroit Tigers scouts
Elmira Pioneers players
Fort Worth Cats players
Greenville Hunters players
Jersey City Skeeters players
Kansas City Blues (baseball) players
Knoxville Smokies players
Lincoln Links players
Lubbock Hubbers players
Major League Baseball third basemen
Major League Baseball shortstops
Marlin Bathers players
Memphis Chickasaws players
Mission Reds players
Montreal Royals players
Pensacola Pilots players
People from West, Texas
Pittsburgh Pirates scouts
Portland Beavers players
Pueblo Steelworkers players
San Francisco Giants scouts
Springfield Senators players
Texas Rangers scouts